The women's hammer throw event at the 1999 All-Africa Games was held on 17 September at the Johannesburg Stadium. It was the first time that this event took place at the All-Africa Games.

Results

References

Athletics at the 1999 All-Africa Games